Prairieview-Ogden Community Consolidated School District 197 is a public school district in Champaign County, Illinois, United States. It was established in 2007 following the consolidation of Prairieview School District #192 and the Ogden Community Consolidated School District #212. It serves the villages of Ogden, Royal, the unincorporated communities of Flatville and Sellers, and the surrounding rural areas.

Schools 
There are three schools in the district:
 Prarireview-Ogden North (K-4), Royal
 Prairieview-Ogden South (K-6), Ogden
 Prairieview-Ogden Jr High School (7-8), Flatville

References

External links 
 

Education in Champaign County, Illinois
School districts in Illinois
School districts established in 2007
2007 establishments in Illinois